In the Hindu epic Mahabharata, Pandu was a king of the Kuru Kingdom. He was the foster-father of the five Pandava brothers, who were the boons bestowed upon his wife Kunti by a number of deities, owing to his inability to bear children following sage Kindama's curse. He belonged to the Kuru Dynasty.

Birth 
When Vichitravirya died of a sickness, Bhishma was unable to ascend the throne because of his vow, and Bahlika's line was unwilling to leave the Bahlika Kingdom. There ensued a succession crisis in Hastinapura. Satyavati then invited her son Vyasa to impregnate the queens Ambika and Ambalika under the Niyoga practice. When Vyasa approached Ambalika, she was frightened by his scary appearance, and she had become pale in disgust; hence, her son was born pale. Thus, Pandu's name means pale.

Reign and marriage

Pandu was taught in the fields of archery, politics, administration and religion by Bhishma. He was an excellent archer and Maharathi (warrior). He became the successor to his kingdom and was crowned King of the Kuru Kingdom. He was married to Kunti, the adoptive daughter of Kuntibhoja and the daughter of Shurasena (father of Vasudeva Anakadundubhi and grandfather of Krishna). His second wife was the princess of the Madra kingdom Madri. The marriage was proposed by Bhishma. Pandu later conquered the territories of the Sindhu Kingdom, Kashi, Anga, Trigarta Kingdom, Kalinga, Magadha, etc., and thus re-established their supremacy over all the kings and increased the span of his empire.

Kindama's Curse

While hunting in a forest (looking from a distance, his vision partially obscured by plants and trees), Pandu saw a couple of deer in the process of coitus, and shot arrows at them; he later discovered that it was the sage Kindama and his wife who were making love in the form of deer. The dying sage placed a curse on Pandu, for not only had he killed them in the midst of lovemaking, but was not remorseful for his actions either. King Pandu argued with sage Kindama by misquoting sage Agastya's ruling on the right of Kshatriyas' on hunting. Sage Kindama then cursed Pandu that were he to approach his wives with the intent of making love, he would die.

Exile and death

Upset and seeking to repent his deed, Pandu handed his kingdom to Dhritarashtra and left for exile in the forest. There, he started to lead the life of an ascetic with his wives.

Birth of Pandu's foster sons

One day, Pandu was regaling the story of his birth and his wish of becoming a father to his first wife, Kunti. Kunti told him about the child-bearing mantra taught to her by the sage Durvasa. Pandu was overjoyed and told Kunti to use it to gain sons from suitable deities. He wanted his son to be righteous, and so he suggested Dharmaraja, the deity of death and righteousness. Kunti chanted her mantra and the deity granted her Yudhishthira. Later, Pandu expressed his desire for a powerful son. This time, Kunti invoked Vayu and Bhima was born. Pandu suggested Kunti to invoke Indra and a valiant son, Arjuna, was born. Pandu felt bad for Madri's childlessness, and thus requested Kunti to share her mantra with her. Heeding his request, Kunti revealed her mantra once to Pandu's younger wife. Madri invoked the Ashvin twins, and then gave birth to Nakula and Sahadeva.

Death
One day, Pandu forgot about the curse and was suddenly filled with lust for Madri. Despite her pleas, he proceeded to engage in sexual intercourse with her. After the act, his curse was fulfilled and he died. His body was cremated within the forest. Attributing her husband's death to herself and swept by remorse, Madri took her own life (possibly through self-immolation) after handing her children over to Kunti.

See also

 Pandava
 The Pandeism of Godfrey Higgins
Historicity of the Mahabharata

References

 Characters in the Mahabharata
Mythological kings